Meland is a surname. Notable people with the surname include:

Edward C. Meland (1866–1939), American educator, newspaper editor, and politician
Eilef A. Meland (born 1947), Norwegian economist, university lecturer, and politician
Gunnar Meland (born 1947), Norwegian curler
Kaare Meland (1915–2002), Norwegian politician
Per Meland (born 1972), Norwegian businessman and media entrepreneur